The following is a list of episodes for the American television sitcom, One Day at a Time. The series premiered on December 16, 1975 on CBS, and ended on May 28, 1984. A total of 209 episodes were produced spanning nine seasons.

Series overview

Episodes

Season 1 (1975–76)

Season 2 (1976–77)

Season 3 (1977–78)

Season 4 (1978–79)

Season 5 (1979–80)

Season 6 (1980–81)

Season 7 (1981–82)

Season 8 (1982–83)

Season 9 (1983–84)

Notes

References

External links 

 
 

Lists of American sitcom episodes